Chongde is a railway station on the Taiwan Railways Administration (TRA) North-link line located in Xiulin Township, Hualien County, Taiwan.

History
The station was opened on 8 February 1979.

On 2 April 2021, at least 50 people died in a train crash near the station.

See also
 List of railway stations in Taiwan

References

1979 establishments in Taiwan
Railway stations in Hualien County
Railway stations opened in 1979
Railway stations served by Taiwan Railways Administration